Mohammad Feyzi is an Iranian academic and reformist politician. He was born in Ardabil. He is a member of the tenth Islamic Consultative Assembly from the electorate of Ardabil, Nir, Namin and Sareyn.

References

External links
 Mohammad Feyzi Website

Living people
Deputies of Ardabil, Nir, Namin and Sareyn
People from Ardabil
Members of the 10th Islamic Consultative Assembly
Islamic Azad University, Central Tehran Branch alumni
Iranian reformists
1981 births
Academic staff of the Islamic Azad University